Suiter is a surname.  Notable people with the surname include:

 Amy Suiter (twenty-first century), American softball coach
 Gary Suiter (1945–1982), American basketball player
 Jane Suiter, Irish journalist and academic
 Marilyn Suiter, geologist